Retz's helmetshrike (Prionops retzii) is a species of bird in the helmetshrike family Vangidae, formerly usually included in the Malaconotidae.

Subspecies
Four subspecies are recognized:
 P. r. nigricans (Neumann, 1899) – south central Africa
 P. r. graculinus Cabanis, 1868 – East Africa
 P. r. retzii Wahlberg, 1856 – northern parts of southern Africa
 P. r. tricolor G.R. Gray, 1864 – eastern and southeastern Africa

Range and habitat
It is found in Angola, Botswana, DRC, Eswatini, Kenya, Malawi, Mozambique, Namibia, Somalia, South Africa, Tanzania, Zambia, and Zimbabwe. Its natural habitats are subtropical or tropical dry forests, subtropical or tropical mangrove forests, and subtropical or tropical moist shrubland.

Gallery

References

External links
 (Retz's helmetshrike = ) Red-billed helmetshrike  Prionops retzii - Species text in The Atlas of Southern African Birds.

Retz's helmetshrike
Birds of Central Africa
Birds of Southern Africa
Retz's helmetshrike
Retz's helmetshrike
Taxonomy articles created by Polbot